The SAMIL 50 is a 4x4 6-ton (load) truck.

Description

Dimensions
Data are based on SAMIL 50 cargo version:
 Length: 
 Width: 
 Height: 
 Wheelbase: 
 Ground Clearance: 
 Track (Front): 
 Track (Rear): 
 Angle of approach: 36°
 Angle of departure: 33°
 Fuel tank capacity: 2x

Weights
 Gross vehicle mass: 
 Front axle rating: 
 Rear axle rating: 
 Payload:

Specifications
 Drive: 4×4
 Engine: Mk I: Deutz F6L 413F  
 Configuration: 6 Cylinders V6
 Engine capacity: 9572 cc
 Cooling: Air-cooled
 Power: 141 kW (188 hp) @ 2500 rpm
 Torque: 632 Nm @ 1600 rpm
 Engine: Mk II: ADE409
 Configuration: 6 Cylinders V6
 Engine capacity: 
 Cooling: Water-cooled
 Power: 
 Torque: 
 Clutch 
 Type: Single dry plate
 Size: 
 Gearbox
 Make/Model: ZF S6-65
 Forward gears: 6 Speed Synchromesh
 Transfer case 
 Make/Model: ZF Z65
 Type: 2 Speed, Permanent 4×4
 Differential Lock: Pneumatically operated
 Axles
 Front: Banjo housing
 Differential Lock: Pneumatically operated
 Rear: Banjo housing
 Differential Lock: Pneumatically operated
 Wheels:
 Single wheel all-round
 Tyre size: 14.0 x 20” – 12 Ply
 Steering type: Rhd – Power Assisted
 Brakes
 Service Brakes: Dual Circuit – Full air
 Park Brake: Pneumatically operated spring
 Suspension
 Springs: Semi elliptical leaf springs
 Shock absorbers: Double acting telescopic hydraulic (Ft & Rr)
 Torsion Bar: Fitted to rear axle
 Electrical
 Voltage: 24V
 Batteries: 2 x 12V 120 A/h
 Cab 
 Type: Forward Control with Canvas Roof
 Seating: Driver + 1 Assistant
 Access to Engine: Cab tilts forward
 Steering: Left-hand Drive
 Standard hard cab

Variants
 Cargo/Personnel Carrier – it has a canvas cover over a steel framework around the cargo area; seats for up to 40 passengers may be installed along the sides or down the center, back to back. 
 Communications vehicle
 Battery-charging vehicle
 Bridge transporter
 Field kitchen vehicle
 Field office
 Flatbed container transporter with ISO locks
 Fuel tanker
 Mobile shower unit vehicle
 Mobile welding shop vehicle
 Radio bin
 Refrigerator pantry Unit
 Refuse collection vehicle
 Technical bin
 Water tanker
 Recovery vehicle
 Kwevoel – Armoured Mine Resistant cargo vehicle

Citations and References

Citations

Bibliography

Cold War military equipment of South Africa
Military vehicles introduced in the 1980s